Hope Hill van Beuren is a Campbell Soup heiress whose net worth was estimated by Forbes to be about $1.1 billion as of March 2011. Her grandfather, John T. Dorrance, invented the condensed soup process.

She is married, has three children, and resides in Middletown, Rhode Island.

References

Living people
American billionaires
Female billionaires
Campbell Soup Company people
Year of birth missing (living people)
1930s births
Place of birth missing (living people)